Gentianella amarella, the autumn gentian, autumn dwarf gentian, or autumn felwort, is a short biennial plant  flowering plant in the gentian family, Gentianaceae. It is found throughout Northern Europe, the western and northern United States, and Canada.

Description
Gentianella amarella  the autumn gentian, autumn dwarf gentian, or autumn felwort is a biennial herbaceous plant, which only produces a low leaf rosette with elliptical to lanceolate leaves in its first year. In the second year it usually grows a stem from 5 to 30 (3 to 50) centimeters long. The stem is straight or branched just above the base; at flowering time it is without leaves which distinguishes it from similar species.

Generative characteristics 
The flowering period is from July to early October, and the axils produce numerous flowers.
 
The relatively small, hermaphrodite flowers are purplish bells (reddish-violet corolla) are trumpet-shaped between 12 and 22 mm long and have five petals with double perianth (calyx and corolla).  The cup is much shorter than the crown tube. The five vestibules are upright and mostly somewhat unequal. The coronet is bearded. The ovary and the fruit are sedentary or rarely short-stalked.

The number of chromosomes is 2n = 36.

Taxonomy and distribution 
Gentianella amarella was first published in 1753 under the name (basionym) Gentiana amarella by Carl Linnaeus. The new combination to Gentianella amarella was published in 1912 by Carl Julius Bernhard Börner. The epithet amarella means somewhat bitter.

There are about five subspecies of Gentianella amarella:

Ecology
Its habitat is in grass, often on lime-rich soil (in England typically on chalk).
It grows on dry, sandy or calcareous soils, but also on wet peat or marl soils and thus thrives in bog meadows. It is growing in the molinion association.

References

External links 

 
 
 Distribution across the Northern hemisphere according to Eric Hultén
 Thomas Meyer: Kranzenzian  Data sheet and identification key with photos Flora-de: Flora von Deutschland.
 Datenblatt Gentianella amarella in Montana Plant Life. 

amarella
Plants described in 1753
Taxa named by Carl Linnaeus